The Württemberg Class B and Class B2 engines were steam locomotives with the Royal Württemberg State Railways (Königlich Württembergische Staats-Eisenbahnen) first built in 1868 by the Maschinenfabrik Esslingen ('Esslingen engineering works') in Esslingen in the former Kingdom of Württemberg in southern Germany. 

The engines had a Crampton boiler, an inside Allan valve gear and, for the first time in Württemberg, a Prüsmann chimney. They were equipped with 2 T 6.5 tenders.

See also
List of DRG locomotives and railbuses
List of Württemberg locomotives and railbuses

2-4-0 locomotives
B and B2
Esslingen locomotives
Railway locomotives introduced in 1868
Standard gauge locomotives of Germany
1B n2 locomotives

Passenger locomotives